The 1909 Geneva Covenanters football team was an American football team that represented Geneva College as an independent during the 1909 college football season. Led by third-year head coach, Arthur McKean, the team compiled a record of 4–2.

Schedule

References

Geneva
Geneva Golden Tornadoes football seasons
Geneva Covenanters football